"Shoots and Ladders" is a song written and recorded by the American nu metal band Korn for their self-titled debut album. It was released as the album's third single in 1995.

Music and structure
The title is a mockery of American children's game Chutes and Ladders (also known in the United Kingdom as Snakes and Ladders), with the song's lyrics mostly consisting of nursery rhymes. It is the first Korn song to feature bagpipes.
The song uses the following nursery rhymes in its lyrics:

"Ring a Ring o' Roses"
"One, Two, Buckle My Shoe"
"London Bridge Is Falling Down"
"Baa, Baa, Black Sheep"
"This Old Man"
"Mary Had a Little Lamb"

Concept
"It was written because all these little kids sing these nursery rhymes and they don't know what they originally meant. Everyone is so happy when singing 'Ring Around the Rosie' but it is about the Black Plague. All of them have these evil stories behind them." – Jonathan Davis

Music video

The video for "Shoots and Ladders" was directed by McG and shows clips of Korn performing in front of an energetic crowd, similar to "Blind". Korn is also seen performing in front of a fake castle-like building. Munky can be seen with duct tape over his mouth while coming out from a field of weeds. In the beginning, Jonathan can be seen tied up and hanging upside down. Head, Fieldy, and David appear in various clips as well, but is not very specific. The video premiered in June 1995. "Shoots and Ladders" was filmed at Golf N' Stuff in Norwalk, California.

Awards
The song was nominated for a Grammy Award in 1997 for Best Metal Performance. This would be Korn's first nomination in any Grammy category.

Track listing
(Source:)

US radio promo
CD5"
"Shoots and Ladders" – 3:39  (radio edit)
"Sean Olson" – 4:45  (radio edit)

UK radio promo
10"
Side A:
"Shoots and Ladders (Hip Hop Remix)" – 4:07
"Shoots and Ladders (Hyper Remix)" – 2:32

Side B:
"Shoots and Ladders (Industrial Remix)" – 3:50
"Shoots and Ladders (Industrial Instrumental)" – 3:59

Credits
Korn
 Jonathan Davis – vocals, bagpipes
 Munky – guitar
 Head – guitar
 Fieldy – bass
 David Silveria – drums
Other
 Ross Robinson – production
 Eddy Schreyer – mastering
 Stephen Stickler – photography
 Jay Papke/Dante Ariola – art direction and design
 Chuck Johnson – engineering and mixing

References

External links

Korn songs
1994 songs
1995 singles
Compositions for bagpipe
Music videos directed by McG
Immortal Records singles
Epic Records singles
Songs written by Reginald Arvizu
Songs written by Jonathan Davis
Songs written by James Shaffer
Songs written by David Silveria
Songs written by Brian Welch
Songs based on children's songs